Yola Cain (1954 – 17 May 2000) was the first Jamaican born woman to gain a commercial and flight instructor license and the first woman to fly in the JDF, the Jamaica Defence Force.

Early life 
Cain, born in Jamaica in 1954, was the second eldest of four siblings. Cain's father had a career in automobiles. As a teenager Cain was confident and gregarious, her sister, Judy Lee, recounts how she was an 'adventurer from a child' who 'everybody' in Kingston Jamaica knew.

Piloting career 
Cain discovered her love for flying at age 19-20, however, during a period of white elitism within Jamaica, women were not flying. Cain, however, persevered and in 1975 gained her commercial flight instructor license. Cain was not the first woman licensed in Jamaica, in 1952 an American, Earsley Barnett, received the first pilot license granted to a woman in Jamaica; Cain was the first Jamaican born woman to receive a license. On 11 August 1976, Cain was among the first women enlisted in the JDF, alongside five others Cain was also considered to be a potential officer. Cain became the first woman pilot of the JDF,  Cain was presented with her wings alongside one other male officer of the JDF, Lt. Commander John McFarlane by the Governor General.  Cain consistently flew for the JDF in the late 1970s and 1980s.

Later life and death 
Cain emigrated to the US in 1985, where she worked at the Universal Studios Hollywood theme park as a part-time cashier. She later became a director of operations for Universal Studios Theme Parks where she was in charge of 200-300 people. Cain died on 17 May 2000 of breast cancer, over 200 people attended Cain's funeral and the family received messages and condolences from as far afield as Japan. Cain had two daughters.

Legacy 
Cain is remembered for a number of reasons. Firstly, her contributions to female empowerment within Jamaica, Cain's brother reportedly described that 'if you gave a boy something to do Yola would do it', this attitude was particularly significant in mid twentieth century Jamaica. Cain's legacy has inspired other women within Jamaica to pursue careers in flight, by 1990 7 other women had followed Cain to become commercial pilots and 371 women had trained to be pilots, including Maria Ziadie-Haddad, the first female commercial pilot hired by Air Jamaica.

Secondly, of note, was Cain's passion for Jamaica, Cain's sister, Judy Lee, described how she provided her with the training to be a Jamaican describing her passion for Jamaica as 'unparalleled', reportedly Cain's grandmother described how 'Yola wanted to be Prime Minister of Jamaica'.  Cain's Catholicism and her faith in God combined with her love for her country meant that she frequently gave back to Jamaican community especially as an alpha alumna.

Cain has frequently been honoured after her death in Jamaica, for example, during celebrations of Jamaica's 50 years of independence she was remembered as a woman who represented 'Jamaican culture' and in December 2011 the Jamaican Civil Aviation Authority recognised her contribution to flight.

Judy Lee Chen, Cain's sister, is currently writing a biography of Cain entitled The Flight of Life.

References 

1954 births
2000 deaths
Deaths from breast cancer
Women aviators
Jamaican Roman Catholics
Jamaican emigrants to the United States
Jamaican women
People from Kingston, Jamaica
Women air force personnel
Deaths from cancer in California
Date of birth missing